Île-aux-Moines (Enizenac'h in Breton; the name means island of the monks) is a commune in the Morbihan department in the region of Brittany in northwestern France.

It is the largest island in the Gulf of Morbihan. It is one of two island communes of the Gulf, the other being Île-d'Arz.

Geography
Île-aux-Moines lies in the Gulf of Morbihan. It is in the shape of a cross and nowhere on the island lies further than 450 metres from the water.

Access from the mainland is possible from Larmor-Baden or Port-Blanc.

History
Île-aux-Moines has been inhabited since the Neolithic period, as attested by the dolmens and other relics.

In 854, the then king of Brittany, Erispoe, gave a donation to the Abbey of Saint-Conwoïon in Redon, created by his father Nominoe. This became storage space of the abbey.

After the Norman invasions of the 10th century. the island was handed back to the parish of Arradon.

In 1453, it was given the status of parish.

In 1792 it became a commune in its own right.

Demographics
Inhabitants of Île-aux-Moines are called Ilois.

Monuments
There are many megalithic relics on the south side:
 The cromlech of Kergonan, in the middle of the island, with a radius of more than 70 metres, is one of Europe's biggest.
 The dolmen of Penhap, 5 kilometres from the main town, is the most well-conserved on the island.
 Crucifices can be found at Trec'h, Brouel and Le Nioul, as well as on Kerno.
The St Michel Chapel

See also
Communes of the Morbihan department

References

External links

Official website
Photos, Guided Tours, Ancient Postcards, Decorated Mailboxes, etc...

Communes of Morbihan
Islands of Brittany
Populated coastal places in Brittany